George Taylor (October 19, 1820 – January 18, 1894) was an American attorney and Democratic politician. He served as a U.S. Representative from New York for one term from 1857 to 1859.

Biography 
Born in Wheeling, Virginia (now West Virginia), Taylor studied medicine and law. He was admitted to the bar and began the practice of law in Indiana.

He moved to Alabama in 1844, and to Brooklyn, New York, in 1848, where he continued his practice and held several local offices.

Congress 
Taylor was elected as a Democrat to the Thirty-fifth Congress (March 4, 1857 – March 3, 1859). In 1858, he was an unsuccessful candidate for reelection to the Thirty-sixth Congress.

Later career and death 
He then resumed his practice of law in Washington, D.C., until his death.

George Taylor died at age 73 in Washington. He is interred in Rock Creek Cemetery.

References 

1820 births
1894 deaths
New York (state) lawyers
Politicians from Wheeling, West Virginia
Burials at Rock Creek Cemetery
Democratic Party members of the United States House of Representatives from New York (state)
19th-century American politicians
Lawyers from Wheeling, West Virginia
19th-century American lawyers